Eupanacra splendens is a moth of the  family Sphingidae.

Distribution 
It is known from the Moluccas, Papua New Guinea, the Solomon Islands and north-eastern Australia.

Description 
The wingspan is about 50 mm. Adults have brown forewings. Each with three white arrow heads at the apex. The hindwings are dark brown, each crossed by a broad orange band.

Biology 
Larvae have been recorded feeding on Epipremnum pinnatum. They have eyespots along each side, with those on the first abdominal segment larger than the others. The tail has a horn that ends in an abrupt point.

Subspecies
Eupanacra splendens splendens (Moluccas (Halmahera, Buru, Ambon, Aru, Kai Islands), Papua New Guinea, Solomon Islands, north-eastern Australia)
Eupanacra splendens paradoxa (Gehlen, 1932) (Moluccas)

References

Eupanacra
Moths described in 1894